Volt Bulgaria (abbreviated Volt) is a social-liberal political party in Bulgaria. It is the Bulgarian branch of Volt Europa, a political movement that operates on a European level. It is currently part of the centrist electoral coalition We Continue the Change.

Foundation
Volt Bulgaria was founded in Sofia on 19 May 2018, with Nastimir Ananiev as its first chairman.

History

2019 European Parliament election
The 2019 European Parliament election was the first election in which Volt took part. The party obtained 0.18% of the Vote in Bulgaria. Although the Bulgarian branch of Volt was unable to obtain a seat in the European Parliament, it is currently represented by the German branch, which won one seat.

2019 Bulgarian local election
Volt Bulgaria participated in the 2019 Bulgarian Local Elections, with the ''Together for Change'' Coalition list, and obtained 7.12% of the votes in Haskovo, 6.12% in Rodopi, and 6.39% in Sopot, earning Volt a seat in each of those localities.

April 2021 Bulgarian parliamentary election
Volt Bulgaria participated in the April 2021 Bulgarian parliamentary election as part of the anti-government coalition ISMV. The coalition gained 14 seats in parliament, none of which were allocated to members of Volt.

July 2021 Bulgarian parliamentary election
Volt Bulgaria participated again in the early July 2021 Bulgarian parliamentary election as part of the anti-government coalition ISMV. The coalition gained 13 seats in parliament, none of which were allocated to members of Volt.

November 2021 Bulgarian parliamentary election 
Volt Bulgaria participated in the November 2021 Bulgarian parliamentary election as part of the electoral coalition We Continue the Change (PP) led by Kiril Petkov and Asen Vasilev, the former caretaker Economy and Finance Ministers, respectively. The coalition gained 67 seats in parliament, two of which was allocated to members of Volt. This makes Volt Bulgaria the second Volt Europa party to enter a national legislature after Volt Netherlands.

Electoral results

National elections

European elections

References

2018 establishments in Bulgaria
Liberal parties in Bulgaria
Political parties established in 2018
Pro-European political parties in Bulgaria
Progressive parties
Social liberal parties
Bulgaria